The year 602 BC was a year of the pre-Julian Roman calendar. In the Roman Empire, it was known as year 152 Ab urbe condita. The denomination 602 BC for this year has been used since the early medieval period, when the Anno Domini calendar era became the prevalent method in Europe for naming years.

Events

Births

Deaths
Philip I of Macedon, early king of Macedon

References